The 2018 Women's Africa Cup of Nations qualification was a women's football competition which decided the participating teams of the 2018 Women's Africa Cup of Nations.

A total of eight teams qualified to play in the final tournament, including Ghana who qualified automatically as hosts.

Teams
Apart from Ghana, the remaining 53 members of CAF were eligible to enter the qualifying competition, and a total of 24 national teams were in the qualifying draw, which was announced in early October 2017.

Equatorial Guinea were initially banned from the 2018 Africa Women Cup of Nations, but were reinstated after the ban was lifted in July 2017 at an emergency CAF committee meeting, and were included in the qualifying draw. However, FIFA banned them from qualifying for the 2019 FIFA Women's World Cup, meaning they could not qualify for the World Cup regardless of their performance in the Africa Women Cup of Nations.

FIFA Women's World Rankings in September 2017 in brackets (NR=Not ranked).

Notes
Teams in bold qualified for the final tournament.

Did not enter

 (NR)
 (NR)
 (118)
 (NR)
 (NR)
 (NR)
 (NR)
 (NR)
 (NR)
 (77)
 (NR)
 (NR)
 (98)
 (NR)
 (NR)
 (NR)
 (NR)
 (NR)
 (NR)
 (NR)
 (NR)
 (111)
 (NR)
 (NR)
 (NR)
 (NR)
 (NR)
 (NR)
 (71)

Format
Qualification ties are played on a home-and-away two-legged basis. If the aggregate score is tied after the second leg, the away goals rule is applied, and if still tied, the penalty shoot-out (no extra time) is used to determine the winner.

Schedule
The schedule of the qualifying rounds is as follows.

The first round was originally scheduled for 26 February – 6 March 2018, and the second round for 2–10 April 2018, but the dates were moved due to a clash with the CAF Women's Symposium in early March.

Bracket
The seven winners of the second round qualified for the final tournament.

First round

Overview

|}

Matches

Algeria won 3–2 on aggregate.

Ethiopia won 15–0 on aggregate.

1–1 on aggregate. Ivory Coast won on away goals.

Mali advanced on walkover after Sierra Leone withdrew.

3–3 on aggregate. Gambia won 5–3 on penalties.

Congo won 3–1 on aggregate.

Kenya won 1–0 on aggregate.

Lesotho won 3–1 on aggregate.

4–4 on aggregate. Zambia won on away goals.

Zimbabwe won 4–0 on aggregate.

Second round
Winners qualified for 2018 Africa Women Cup of Nations.

Overview

|}

Matches

Algeria won 6–3 on aggregate.

2–2 on aggregate. Mali won on away goals.

Nigeria won 7–0 on aggregate.

Cameroon won 10–0 on aggregate.

Equatorial Guinea won 3–2 on aggregate. On 17 October 2018, Kenya were awarded the tie after Equatorial Guinea were disqualified for fielding an ineligible player. However, on 7 November 2018, the decision was overturned on appeal.

South Africa won 7–0 on aggregate.

2–2 on aggregate. Zambia won on away goals.

Qualified teams
The following eight teams qualified for the final tournament.

1 Bold indicates champions for that year. Italic indicates hosts for that year.

Goalscorers

Notes

References

External links
11th Edition Women AFCON- GHANA 2018, CAFonline.com

Qualification
2018
Women Cup of Nations qualification
2018 in women's association football
April 2018 sports events in Africa
June 2018 sports events in Africa
Cameroon at the 2019 FIFA Women's World Cup
Nigeria at the 2019 FIFA Women's World Cup
South Africa at the 2019 FIFA Women's World Cup